Danbury Municipal Airport  is a public use general aviation and commercial airport located three miles (5 km) southwest of the central business district of Danbury, in Fairfield County, Connecticut, United States. The airport opened in 1930. It is currently run by the City of Danbury under the management of Michael Safranek. It is included in the Federal Aviation Administration (FAA) National Plan of Integrated Airport Systems for 2017–2021, in which it is categorized as a regional reliever airport facility.

The Reliant Air building burned down on the evening of September 12, 2007. The hangar was located on the northeast side of the airport. It has since been rebuilt and Reliant Air continues in business.

History
In 1928, local pilots purchased a 60-acre tract near the Danbury Fairgrounds, known as Tucker's Field.  This property was leased to the town in 1930 and became the Danbury Municipal Airport.

Facilities and aircraft 

 Runway 8/26: 4,422 x 150 ft (1,348 x 46 m), surface: asphalt
 Runway 17/35: 3,135 x 100 ft (956 x 30 m), surface: asphalt

The airport has three instrument approaches:
 Localizer Runway 8: decision height -  AGL
 VOR or GPS-A: decision height -  AGL
 GPS Runway 8: decision height -  AGL

For the 12-month period ending December 31, 2021, the airport had 53,524 aircraft operations, an average of 147 per day: 43% local general aviation, 53% transient general aviation, 3% air taxi and 1% military. There were 209 aircraft based at this airport: 169 single engine, 23 multi-engine, 10 jet aircraft and 7 helicopters.

The Connecticut Wing Civil Air Patrol 399th Composite Squadron (NER-CT-042) operates out of the airport. The hangar is located next to runway 35.

Airlines and destinations

Passenger

Accidents and incidents

 On October 16, 2011, a Cirrus SR22 crashed in a field near the airport. The aircraft's one occupant was killed in the crash.
 On January 22, 2013, a Cirrus SR22 landed on South Street in Danbury, The Cirrus CAP System was deployed and all three occupants were able to exit the aircraft safely without incident.
 On August 21, 2015, an Eclipse 500 (N120EA) veered off Runway 26, causing minor injuries to the occupants and badly damaging the aircraft.
 On July 30, 2017, a Cessna 172 (N612DF) crashed in a dog park in Danbury shortly after taking off of Runway 26. Of the three passengers, two were injured, and one was killed from the crash.
 On September 22, 2017, a Cessna 180 (N9624B) experienced a ground loop, causing the plane to partially cartwheel which severely damaged the engine and nose structure. The pilot experienced no injuries and the plane was subsequently repaired.

See also 
Flying 20 Club, one of the oldest continuously active flying clubs

References

External links 
https://www.danbury-ct.gov/169/Airport

Airports in Fairfield County, Connecticut
Buildings and structures in Danbury, Connecticut
Airports established in 1930
1930 establishments in Connecticut